William Henry Redfield (January 26, 1927 – August 17, 1976) was an American actor and author who appeared in many theatrical, film, radio, and television roles.

Early years
Born in New York City, Redfield was the son of Henry C. Redfield and the former Mareta A. George. His father was a conductor and arranger of music, and his mother was a chorus girl with the Ziegfeld Follies.

Acting career
Redfield began acting when he was 9 years old, appearing in the Broadway production Swing Your Lady (1936). He appeared in the original 1938 Broadway production of Our Town. A founding member of New York's Actors Studio, Redfield's additional theatre credits include A Man for All Seasons, Hamlet, You Know I Can't Hear You When the Water's Running, and Dude. He also sang and danced the role of Mercury in Cole Porter's Out of This World.

Other Broadway credits include Excursion (1937), Virginia (1937), Stop-over (1938), Junior Miss, Snafu, U.S.A., Barefoot Boy With Cheek (1947), Montserrat (1949), Misalliance (1953), Double in Hearts (1956), Midgie Purvis (1961), A Minor Adjustment (1967) and The Love Suicide at Schofield Barracks (1972).

His film credits include The Connection, Such Good Friends, Fantastic Voyage, A New Leaf  and For Pete's Sake. Redfield's best known film appearance was as Dale Harding in One Flew Over the Cuckoo's Nest.

On television, Redfield played the title role in the DuMont series Jimmy Hughes, Rookie Cop (1953), and appeared in The Philco Television Playhouse, Lux Video Theatre, The United States Steel Hour, Studio One, As the World Turns, Alfred Hitchcock Presents, Gunsmoke, Naked City, Maude, Rich Man, Poor Man Book II, Bewitched , and The Bob Newhart Show. His best known TV appearance was as Floyd, the younger brother of Felix Unger (played by Tony Randall), on The Odd Couple.

Military service
During his acting career, Redfield served as an infantryman during WWII, holding the rank of technician fifth grade.

Author
In his book Letters from an Actor, Redfield published a colorful and personal recollection of his work in the 1964 international stage production of Hamlet, starring Richard Burton and directed by Sir John Gielgud. He also was a columnist for Playfare Magazine and collaborated with Wally Cox on Mr. Peepers, a book about the television character with that name.

Death
During the filming of One Flew Over the Cuckoo's Nest, Redfield was diagnosed with leukemia, after a doctor on set had noticed he was exhibiting symptoms of the disease. Redfield died at Saint Clare's Hospital on August 17, 1976, at age 49, with the cause of death given as "a respiratory ailment complicated by leukemia." With his wife, he had a son and a daughter. Redfield was buried at Long Island National Cemetery in Farmingdale, New York.

Filmography

Radio appearances

References

External links
 
 
 
 Letters from an Actor on Amazon.com

1927 births
1976 deaths
American male stage actors
American male film actors
American male television actors
American male radio actors
Burials at Long Island National Cemetery
Deaths from leukemia
Male actors from New York City
Deaths from cancer in New York (state)
20th-century American male actors
United States Army personnel of World War II
United States Army soldiers